The Samsung Galaxy A03 is a series of budget Android smartphones manufactured by Samsung Electronics that includes the A03, A03s and A03 Core. They have a 6.5 inch HD+ Infinity-V display, a 5000 mAh Li-Po battery, and ship with Android 11. (can be upgraded to Android 13)

The A03 has a dual-camera setup with a 48 MP main camera.

Specifications

Hardware 
The Samsung Galaxy A03 is equipped with a 6.5 in PLS TFT capacitive touchscreen with a resolution of 720 x 1600 (~270 ppi). The phone itself measures 164.2 x 75.9 x 9.1 mm (6.46 x 2.99 x 0.36 inches) and weighs 196 grams (6.91 oz). The A03 is constructed with a glass front and a plastic back and frame. This device is powered by the Unisoc Tiger T606 SoC with Octa-core (2x1.6 GHz & 6x1.6 GHz) CPU and an ARM Mali-G57 MP2 650 MHz GPU. The phone can have either 32 GB, 64 or 128 GB of internal storage as well as either 3 GB or 4 GB of RAM. Internal storage can be expanded via a Micro SD card up to 512GB. The phone also includes a 3.5mm headphone jack. It has a non-removable 5000mAh lithium-ion battery.

Camera 
The Samsung Galaxy A03 has a dual-camera setup arranged vertically on the left side of the rear of the phone along with the flash. The main camera is a 48 MP wide lens and the second is a 2 MP depth sensor. The main camera can record video up at 1080p @ 30fps. A single 5 MP front-facing camera is present in a notch.

Software 
The Samsung Galaxy A03 originally came with One UI Core 3.1 over Android 11 but it can be updated to One UI Core 5 over Android 13.

References 

Samsung Galaxy
Mobile phones introduced in 2021
Android (operating system) devices
Samsung smartphones
Mobile phones with multiple rear cameras